Bagheria is a city and comune in the Metropolitan City of Palermo in Sicily, Italy, located approximately 10km to the east of the city centre.

Etymology
According to some sources, the name Bagheria (by way of old Sicilian Baarìa) originates from the Phoenician term Bayharia meaning "land that descends toward the sea." Other sources claim that it derives from the Arabic Bāb al-Gerib, or "windy gateway." However, the most plausible explanation is that it derives from Arabic  , meaning 'of the sea, marine'. According to "Deciphering the English Code", Joseph Aronesty, the BAGH refers to a "base or bottom". Eria is just "earth" or land, from Hebrew "eretz" and many old languages. Also "area" Latin. Bagheria therefore means what it is, a land at the bottom of mountains.

History
Since its founding, the town has gone by the names of Bayharia, Baharia, and Baarìa. In 1658 Giuseppe Branciforti, Prince of Butera and  former Viceroy of Sicily, built a large villa and established the region as the preferred location for the vacation homes of Palermo's elites. Villas like the fortified Villa San Marco (designed by Andrea Cirrincione) with angled bastions and a drawbridge soon followed. The area experienced a boom in villa building roughly coinciding with the period of Savoyard (1713–21) and Habsburg (1721–30) rule and continuing for several decades thereafter. The two most striking baroque residences, Villa Valguarnera and Villa Palagonia were designed by the architect Tommaso Napoli in 1712 and 1715 respectively. Both were completed only decades later. Napoli had been influenced by his experiences in Rome and Vienna and this is reflected in his designs. Other architects and clients like Giuseppe Mariani and the Prince of Aragona also looked to prints of Roman exemplars when constructing the Villa Aragona (now Cutò) in 1714.

By 1763, tastes were changing. The Villa Villarosa, supervised by the young G. V. Marvuglia, was directly modeled on more neoclassical plans published by Jean-François de Neufforge in 1760. In 1769, one of the descendants of the original Prince of Butera redesigned his estate into a well-planned town, allowing him to collect rents from the inhabitants. Bagheria was a preferred stopping point for Europeans pursuing the Grand Tour in Sicily including Patrick Brydone, Johann Wolfgang von Goethe, John Soane, Karl Friedrich Schinkel and many others.

In the 20th and 21st centuries, the Baroque and Neoclassical architecture of Bagheria was largely obscured by unregulated building.

Main sights
 Villa Palagonia, renowned for its complex external staircase, curved façades, and marble. Designed by Tommaso Maria Napoli, it is today open to the public.
 Other notable building include Villa Butera, Villa Valguarnera, Villa Trabia, Villa Spedalotto, Villa San Cataldo, Villa Villarosa, Villa San Marco, Villa Filangeri, Villa Sant'Isidoro, Villa Ramacca, Villa Serradifalco, Villa Larderia, Villa Campofranco.
 The Museum of the painter Renato Guttuso with a permanent exhibition of his work is placed in Villa Cattolica. A famous collection of old sicilian toys, il Museo del Giocattolo di Pietro Piraino, is placed in Villa Cuto.

Religion
Although the official feast day of St. Joseph, the town's patron saint, is March 19, it is celebrated in Bagheria the first Sunday of August; religious celebrations are held throughout the week leading up to Sunday, when more solemn ceremonies are initiated; the following Monday evening festivities conclude with a fireworks display.

Culture
Bagheria was the birthplace of many well-known 20th century figures: poet Ignazio Buttitta, photographer Ferdinando Scianna, artists Renato Guttuso and Nino Garajo (1918—1977, Rome), gangster Joe Aiello, and film director Giuseppe Tornatore.
Tornatore portrayed his love for his town in the multiple award-winning film Nuovo Cinema Paradiso in 1989 and the 2009 film Baarìa, featuring the history of the town from the 1930s to the 1980s through the life of a local family.

The town is also depicted in The Godfather Part III.

Bagheria is the setting of Dacia Maraini's eponymous autobiographical work.

References

External links

 

 
Sicilian Baroque